Carex extensa is a species of sedge known by the common name long-bracted sedge. It is native to Europe, North Africa, and the Middle East.

References

extensa
Flora of Europe
Flora of North Africa
Flora of Macaronesia
Flora of Western Asia
Plants described in 1794